Liquid Silver is an album by pianist Andy LaVerne recorded in 1984 (with one track from 1981) and released on the DMP label.

Track listing 
All compositions by Andy LaVerne except where noted.
 "IRS (It's Really Something)" – 7:15
 "Liquid Silver" – 5:58
 "One Page Waltz" (John Abercrombie) – 5:16
 "Laurie" (Bill Evans) – 8:59
 "Letter to Evan" (Evans) – 7:05
 "How My Heart Sings" (Earl Zindars) – 5:32
 "Turn Out the Stars" (Evans) – 6:30
 "Alpha Blue" – 6:20
 "King's House One" – 17:20

Source:

Personnel 
Andy LaVerne – piano, arranger
Eddie Gómez – bass (tracks 1, 3, 4 & 6–8)
Peter Erskine – drums (tracks 1, 3, 4 & 6–8)
John Abercrombie – guitar (tracks 2, 3, 7 & 8)
Essex String Quartet (tracks 5 & 9)
Sebu Sirinian, Jennifer Cowles – violin
Amy Dulsky – viola
Patricia Smith – cello

References 

Andy LaVerne albums
1984 albums
DMP Digital Music Products albums